Tor Skeie (born 8 August 1965) is a Norwegian freestyle skier. He was born in Trondheim, and represented the club Trond Freestyleklubb. He competed at the 1994 Winter Olympics in Lillehammer.

He was Norwegian champion in aerials in 1986, 1987, 1989, and 1995.

References

External links

1965 births
Living people
Sportspeople from Trondheim
Norwegian male freestyle skiers
Olympic freestyle skiers of Norway
Freestyle skiers at the 1994 Winter Olympics